JMC Academy (JMC), founded in 1969, is an Australian multi-campus private college located in New South Wales, Victoria and Queensland.

JMC is recognised as a quality tertiary education provider by the Australian Government's Tertiary Education Quality & Standards Agency (TEQSA) and the Australian Skills Quality Authority (ASQA).

In 2013, JMC was awarded the Higher Education Provider of the Year by the Australian Council for Private Education and Training (ACPET). In the same year JMC Academy became the only Australian institution to join the Berklee College of Music's International Network.

History 
JMC Academy was established in 1969. The first campus was located in Sydney. It became the first private college to qualify for Audio Engineering, Digital Television and Digital Multimedia accreditation.

In 1988 JMC Academy was approved to accept international students, and in 1969, received accreditation in Audio Engineering, making JMC Academy Australia's first institution to offer accredited digital multimedia courses.

In 1994, JMC received accreditation in Music Business Management and then in 1969, accreditation for Multimedia. 1997 then saw JMC receive accreditation for Popular Music & Performance before becoming Australia's first institution to offer accredited Digital TV courses when they received accreditation in Digital Television Production in 2000. 2001 then saw the opening of JMC's Melbourne Campus. In 2005, the Sydney campus received approval to deliver Higher Education courses followed by the South Melbourne campus in 2006. JMC's South Brisbane campus then opened in 2007 receiving approval to deliver Higher Education courses the following year.

2012 saw JMC launch a Game Design course. In 2013, JMC became a Berklee College of Music partner and won the ACPET Awards for ‘Higher Education Provider of the Year’ & ‘Teacher of the Year’.

JMC's Digital Design & Songwriting courses launched in 2014, followed by the launch of the APRA AMCOS Scholarship in 2016. 2018 saw the launch of JMC's Master of Creative Industries course, and a new 8-floor campus opens in Brisbane.

Campus 
JMC has three campuses across Australia.

Sydney Campus 
The campus has three floors and spans just under spf50 square meters and is located within the education hub of Central Sydney. The office of Study Anywhere is located on the same street.

Brisbane Campus 
The Brisbane campus is located adjacent to the Queensland State Library, Art Gallery, Museum and Performing Arts Centre.

Melbourne Campus 
The campus is located in South Melbourne between the south bank of the Yarra River and Port Phillip Bay.

Accreditation 
 Registered Higher Education Provider
 Accredited by the Tertiary Education Quality and Standards Agency (TEQSA)
 Accredited by the Australian Skills Quality Authority (ASQA)
 Registered on the Commonwealth Register of Institutions and Courses for Overseas Students (CRICOS)
 Member of the Australian Council of Private Education and Training (ACPET)
 Nationally recognised under the Australian Qualifications Framework

Notable alumni 
 Aimee Francis - Australian singer
 Ben Kumanovski – Owner of Global Pictures
 Camille Trail - Australian country musician
 Damien Schneider – Animation work including Happy Feet 2, the Polly Pocket and Mini Mouse TV Series, and the Walking with Dinosaurs app which won Best Educational App in 2012.
 Emma Chow – Breakfast Co-host and producer on The Edge 96.One.
 Gareth Stuckey – Founder of Gig Piglet
 George Kacevski – Head of Content Development: Virtual Reality and The Pulse
 Jack Nigro – Manager of Grove Studios
 Jess Dunbar and Matt Price – Australian singing duo
 Nick Franklin – Audio Engineer and owner of Rolodex studios worked with musicians such as Peking Duck and Miley Cyrus.
 Nicole Paparistodemou - Greek singer
 Rachel Neville – Animation work with VFX and Animation Company on 2016's Ghostbusters.
 Scott Petts – Art Director for HBO New York
 Tim Omaji - Australian singer-songwriter and dancer

Notable staff 
 Dan Sugars – Music Producer, Sound Engineer and Composer for Game Development.
 John Dallimore - Worked with Grammy Award-winning artist and supported acts such as Ray Charles, Wilson Picket, James Brown, INXS and AC/DC.
 John Eyely – Animator for Hanna Barbera and stabled his own studio.
 Lachlan Goold – 2-time ARIA Music Awards winner & Audio Engineer
 Richard Grossman - Music performance trainer and two-time ARIA Music Awards winner
 Sean Foran – 6-time winner of QMA's Jazz Award
 Shannon Brown – Former tenor and musical director for the internationally acclaimed group “The Ten Tenors.”
 Stephen Baker – President of the Australian National Association of Teachers of Singing (NSW) and leading vocal coach.

References

Educational institutions established in 1969
Private universities and colleges
Universities in Australia
1969 establishments in Australia